Maruosa is a Japanese producer of breakcore/cybergrind music based in Tokyo, Japan.

He has been invited to festivals around the world, including CTM in Germany, Glade in the UK, Sónar in Spain, Roskilde in Denmark, Supersonic in the UK, This Is Not Art/Electrofringe in Australia, SXSW in the USA, GOGBOT in the Netherlands, and Lausanne Underground Film and Music Festival in Switzerland.

Discography

Singles 

 Maruosa vs Doddodo "Bibibibibibin vol.1" (Rendarec) CDR 2002
 Mushimamire (Hirntrust Grind Media) 7" 2006
 Untitled (Kriss Records) 12" 2008

Albums 

 Exercise and Hell (Rendarec) CD 2007
 Exstream!!!!!!!!! (Rendarec/Grindcore Karaoke) CD 2011
 ALIAS (Self released) Download + Cassette 2017

Compilation appearances 

 "Swimsuit Squad" (Murder Yacht School) CD 2002
 "J-pop terrorizm" (Ihihi) CD 2003
 "G2 Compilation CD" (G2 PRODUCT) CD 2003
 SPICE by Punquestion (M.O.P. Recordings) CD 2003
 Hard Marchan in Osaka (Nazna Oiran Inc) CD 2004
 Tsunbosajiki (Rendarec) CD 2005
 MCP2005gb (Ihihi) CD 2006
 Romz 4th Anniversary Limited CD (Romz) CD 2006
 Misono Days (Studio Warp) Book+CD 2006
 Tough Titties (Goulburn Poultry Fanciers Society) CD 2006
 CTM.07 Audio Compilation (rx:tx) CD 2007
 MIDI_sai Hit Parade (Midiskee Record) CD 2007
 Can Buy Me Love IV (Digital Vomit) 2xCD 2007
 Statement Of Intent (Noize:tek Recordings) CD 2007
 Osaka Invasion MixCD (De-fragment) MIX CD 2008
 Osaka Invasion Sampler CD (De-fragment) CD 2008

Remixes 

 Watermelon Dude Zone / Germlin (Megapixxels) CDR 2006
 Black Long Hair Nice Wah Pedal / gagakirize (Teenage Riot)CD 2009
 Edge of Chaos reconstruction/Live&Remixxx / Wrench (Blues Interactions) CD 2011

References

External links 

  Maruosa's Website
 Maruosa's Bandcamp
 Deathstorm Myspace

Year of birth missing (living people)
Living people
Japanese electronic musicians